Ron Bradley (born February 9, 1951) is a retired men's college basketball coach. Bradley has been inducted into the Hall of Fame as a player at his high school (North Quincy,(MA) HS, College Eastern Nazarene, and the New England Basketball HOF. As a coach he has been inducted into the Radford University and the Big South Conference Halls Of Fame. He was drafted by the New York Nets in 1972 and holds a Ph.D. in Sport Psychology from the University of Maryland, College Park.   He has served as associate head coach at DePaul, Clemson, James Madison University, assistant coach for the University of Maryland, College Park and Longwood University, and the head coach at Radford University, where he led the team to its first NCAA tournament. He is a 1973 graduate of the Eastern Nazarene College, where he also served as head coach. In 2009, he was one of 20 semifinalists and later was named assistant coach of the year.

Head coaching record

References

1951 births
Living people
Basketball coaches from Massachusetts
Clemson Tigers men's basketball coaches
Clemson University alumni
College men's basketball head coaches in the United States
DePaul Blue Demons men's basketball coaches
Eastern Nazarene College alumni
Eastern Nazarene College faculty
James Madison Dukes men's basketball coaches
Longwood Lancers men's basketball coaches
Maryland Terrapins men's basketball coaches
Radford Highlanders men's basketball coaches
Sportspeople from Springfield, Massachusetts